General Fire Brigade of Guangdong is the provincial emergency service force for firefighting and rescue in Guangdong and under the order of the China Fire and Rescue Force (Chinese: 中国消防救援队), which is part of the civil service and administrated by the Ministry of Emergency Management (MEM).

Most fire fighting units in China are aligned under provincial brigades with the exception of large urban centres like Beijing.

Modern fire fighting gear and garments are being worn and replace the green garments used in the 1970s and 1980s.

Appliances

 Motorcycle pumper
 Oshkosh T3000 Airport tender - Baiyun Airport
 Volvo 7 Tubro Mark II ladder
 Iveco Magirus Eurofire ladder 54'
 Rosenbauer Panther 8X8 ARFF airport tender - Baiyun Airport
 Isuzu Hose Truck
 Stokota fire vehicles
 Iveco Magirus pumpers
 Telemax FLF-6000
  DongFeng trucks
   trucks

References

 Guangdong Fire Brigade

Fire departments of China